MASWCD, or Minnesota Association of Soil and Water Conservation Districts, is a nonprofit organization which exists to provide leadership and a common voice for Minnesota’s Conservation district's and to maintain a positive, results-oriented relationship with rule making agencies, partners and legislators; expanding education opportunities for the districts so they may carry out effective conservation programs.

MASWCD consists of member Conservation district's from around the state of Minnesota and provides training seminars for staff and supervisors alike in member Conservation district's as well as a yearly convention, the MASCWD Annual meeting and trade show.

Member Conservation district's are split by geography into 8 areas: NW Area 1, WC Area 2, NE Area 3, Metro Area 4, SW Area 5, SC Area 6, SE Area 7, NC Area 8.

References

Organizations based in Minnesota
Water conservation in the United States
Water organizations in the United States
Soil